The Kosovo women's national basketball team represents Kosovo in international women's basketball. It is controlled by the Basketball Federation of Kosovo, the governing body for basketball in Kosovo.

Competitive record

European Championship for Small Countries

Team

Current roster
The following is the Kosovo roster were called up for the 2021 FIBA Women's European Championship for Small Countries.

<noinclude>

References

External links
 

Women's national basketball teams